Quince Orchard is a neighborhood of the U.S. city of Gaithersburg, Maryland, United States, located on the western outskirts of the city.

Geography
Quince Orchard is located south of Kentlands, right on the western city limits of Gaithersburg. The intersection of Darnestown Road and Quince Orchard Road is the epicenter of Quince Orchard.

History
The area has been known as Quince Orchard since at least 1885. Quince Orchard has had its own post office since at least 1899. 

McDonald Chapel, now called Pleasant View Church, was dedicated in 1903. It was named after the late Rev. W.A. McDonald, who began the movement leading to the building of the church.

In 1984, the Montgomery County Council voted to build Quince Orchard High School in order to reduce crowding at Gaithersburg High School, and it allocated $20 million for its construction in 1984. The school was expected to have 1,680 students upon opening, and it was designed to have a capacity of 2,000 students. In 1987, a group of parents asked the Board of Education to name the school Potomac Falls High School instead, but the Board of Education decided to name it Quince Orchard High School because it was being built on Quince Orchard Road. Construction costs ended up totaling $26 million by the time the school opened on September 6, 1988.

Education
Quince Orchard High School
Quince Orchard Library
Rachel Carson Elementary School

External links

External links

Neighborhoods of Gaithersburg, Maryland